111 Songs is a project released by Hollerado in 2015. The project came to be when the band released a special promotional bundle for their second album White Paint. The bundle consisted of a T-shirt, the album, a poster, and a custom song. After realizing their mistake, and selling well over 100 bundles; the band removed the bundle to avoid having to write more songs. After delaying the custom songs for a while, the band decided to fulfil their promise to their loyal fans. The project took over 2 years to write and record, and the final result was enough content to fill over 5 full-length albums. Each song is written for a fan, and their name or pseudonym is listed after the title.

Track listing

References

2015 albums
Hollerado albums